Catch-22 is a 1961 post-modernist satirical novel by Joseph Heller. 

Catch-22 or CATCH-22 may also refer to:

Film and television
Catch-22 (film), the 1970 film adaptation of the novel Catch-22
Catch-22 (miniseries), 2019 American-British-Italian TV adaptation of the novel Catch-22
"Catch-22" (Lost), an episode of television series Lost

Music
Catch 22 (band), an American ska-punk band

Albums
Catch 22 (Hypocrisy album)
Catch 22 (Tinchy Stryder album)
Katch-22, side A of the Alien Sex Fiend album Curse

Songs
"Catch 22" (song), a song by Illy featuring Anne-Marie from Two Degrees
"Catch 22", a song by the Haunted from Unseen
"Catch-22", a song by P!nk from Missundaztood
"Catch 22", a 1982 song by Billy Squier from Emotions in Motion

Other uses
Catch-22 (logic), a type of logical conundrum illustrated by situations in the novel
Catch22 (charity), a UK young people's charity
Catch-22 (play), the 1971 Broadway adaptation of the novel
Catch-22 (video game), a 2012 iOS game
CATCH-22, a mnemonic describing symptoms of the genetic disorder 22q11.2 deletion syndrome

See also
Catch Thirtythree, an album by Meshuggah
Dilemma
Double bind, a term for a common instance of the catch-22 logical conundrum in psychology
Hobson's choice